Federal Science and Technical College, Yaba is a Federal Government owned secondary school, run by the Federal Ministry of Education. It is a mixed secondary school situated in Yaba, Lagos State, Nigeria.

History 
Federal Science and Technical College, Yaba was founded in 1948.

References 

Secondary schools in Nigeria
Government schools in Nigeria